Paolo Barca, Schoolteacher and Weekend Nudist is a 1975 Italian comedy film directed by Flavio Mogherini.

Cast 
Renato Pozzetto: Paolo Barca
Magali Noël:  Rosaria Cacchiò
Janet Agren:  Giulia Hamilton
Stefano Satta Flores: Director  
Valeria Fabrizi: Miss Manzotti
Miranda Martino: Assunta Calabrò
Paola Borboni: Countess Felicita Barca 
Annabella Incontrera

References

External links

Paolo Barca, Schoolteacher and Weekend Nudist

1975 films
Italian comedy films
1975 comedy films
Films directed by Flavio Mogherini
Films with screenplays by Ugo Pirro
1970s Italian films